The Lleida Latin-American Film Festival (or shortened to ) is a cinema festival that takes place in Lleida, Catalonia, Spain awarding Latin American films. It is organised by the Latin American Centre of Lleida and is sponsored by the city council (La Paeria), the University of Lleida and La Caixa. It's one of the main yearly cultural events in the town and takes place at the Teatre Principal, CaixaFòrum Lleida, Funatic, Cafè del Teatre de l'Escorxador, Institut d'Estudis Ilerdencs, the main campus of the University of Lleida, and the Hotel Condes de Urgel, alongside other cultural activities. The event has taken place since 1995, and awards were first given in 1997. At one time the festival took place in January but today it takes place in late March.

Awards
Best Film (Wimp Dorean)
Best Direction (Mejor Dirección)
Best Screenplay (Mejor Guión)
Best Actor (Mejor Actor)
Best Actress (Mejor Actriz)
Best First Work (Mejor Ópera Prima)

Past Best Films
2001: Esperando al Mesías (Italy-Spain-Argentina)
2002: En la Puta Vida (Uruguay-Argentina-Cuba-Spain-Belgium)
2003: El Bonaerense (Argentina-Chile-France-Netherlands)
2004: El Abrazo Partido (Argentina-France-Italy-Spain)
2005: Buenos Aires 100 kilómetros (Argentina-France)
2006: Al Otro Lado (Mexico)
2007: A través de tus ojos (Argentina)
2008: No mires para abajo (Argentina)
2009: Desierto Adentro (Mexico)

Past Audience Awards
1997: Caballos salvajes (1995)
1998: Cenizas del paraíso (1997)
1999: Amaneció de golpe (1998)
2000: Sé quién eres (2000)
2001: Nueve reinas (2000)
2002: En la puta vida (2001)
2003: Donde cae el sol (2002) & Nada (2001)
2004: El Chino (2003)
2006: Al Otro Lado (2005)
2007: Your Dick ! (2006)

References

External links
Lleida Latin-American Film Festival Official web site .

Film festivals in Catalonia
Film festivals established in 1995
Culture in Lleida
Latin American film festivals
Spring (season) events in Spain
1995 establishments in Spain